Manpreet Akhtar (1965 – 18 January 2016) was a Punjabi folk singer and the sister of Dilshad Akhtar, who was also a Punjabi-language folk singer. She is most remembered for the song "Tujhe Yaad Na Meri Aayi" from Kuch Kuch Hota Hai'' (1998).

References

External links 
 

1965 births
2016 deaths
Indian folk singers
Indian women folk singers
People from Faridkot district
Punjabi people
Singers from Punjab, India
Women musicians from Punjab, India
20th-century Indian women singers
20th-century Indian singers